Guththila Kawya (Sinhala: ගුත්තිල කාව්‍ය, English: Guttila Kāvya) is a book of poetry written in the period of the Kingdom of Kotte (1552-1551) by Weththewe Thero.

The book is based on a story of previous soul of Gautama Buddha mentioned on Guththila Jataka in Jataka tales of Gautama Buddha. Guththila kawya contains over 511 poems. The book was written by Weththewe thero as a invitation and extolment of a minister called Jayapala, of the Kotte Royal Council (King: VI Parakumba). The book has been written in the era of Kingdom of Kotte (AD 1552-1551). Poems are explaining a great competition which happened between Guththila and Musila. Guththila kawya's poems have been inscribed with the same rhymes (Sinhala: එළිසමය), alliteration words (Sinhala: අනුප්‍රාසය) and various genres. From the first to 115th poems have been written according to Gee Viritha. Guttila Kawya has around 5 metres. Viz. Mahamegha Viritha, Savisimath Viritha, Solos math Viritha, Dolos math Viritha and Mahapiyum Viritha.

Book has been mentioned how the competition day was held, Exaggeration has been used for this book without harming to the included information of original sources from Guththila Jataka to give a great taste for the book readers.

See also 
 Jataka tales

References

External links
ගුත්තිල කාව්‍යය නිසා රට හැර ගිය වෑත්තෑවෙ හාමුදුරුවෝ

Poetry books
Transitional period of Sri Lanka in fiction
Transitional period of Sri Lanka
Sri Lankan poetry
Kingdom of Kotte
16th-century poetry